Psychrolutes subspinosus is a species of marine ray-finned fish belonging to the family Psychrolutidae, the fatheads. This species reaches a maximum published total length of

References

subspinosus
Fish described in 1902